Gordon Banks (1937–2019) was an English football goalkeeper.

Gordon Banks may also refer to:
Gordon Banks (musician) (born 1955), American guitarist, producer and writer
Gordon Banks (politician) (born 1955), British Labour Party politician
Gordon Banks (American football) (born 1958), former American football wide receiver
Matthew Gordon-Banks (born 1961), British Conservative Party politician